André Trulsen (born 28 May 1965) is a German former footballer who played as a defender or midfielder. He is best known for his long association with FC St. Pauli, where he played more than 400 games.

In 2010, as part of FC St. Pauli's celebration of its 100th anniversary, fans voted Trulsen as one of the best players in the club's history during his three stints at the club

References

1965 births
Living people
Association football midfielders
German footballers
Footballers from Hamburg
FC St. Pauli players
1. FC Köln players
Holstein Kiel players
Bundesliga players
German football managers
FC St. Pauli managers
HEBC Hamburg players